Night and the City is a 1950 film noir directed by Jules Dassin and starring Richard Widmark, Gene Tierney and Googie Withers. It is based on the novel of the same name by Gerald Kersh. Shot on location in London and at Shepperton Studios, the plot revolves around an ambitious hustler who meets continuous failures.

Dassin later confessed that he had never read the novel upon which the film is based. In an interview appearing on The Criterion Collection DVD release, Dassin recalls that the casting of Tierney was in response to a request by Darryl Zanuck, who was concerned that personal problems had rendered the actress "suicidal" and hoped that work would improve her state of mind. The film's British version was five minutes longer, with a more upbeat ending and featuring a completely different film score. Dassin endorsed the American version as closer to his vision.

The film contains a very tough and prolonged fight scene between Stanislaus Zbyszko, a celebrated professional wrestler in real life, and Mike Mazurki, who before becoming an actor was himself a professional wrestler.

Plot
Harry Fabian is an ambitious American hustler and con man on the make in London. He maintains a fractured relationship with the honest Mary Bristol, nightclub owner and businessman Phil Nosseross, and Helen, who is Phil's scheming wife.

While attempting a con at a wrestling match, Fabian witnesses Gregorius, a veteran Greek wrestler, arguing with his son Kristo, who has organised the fight, and who effectively controls all wrestling in London. After denouncing Kristo's event as tasteless exhibitionism that shames the sport's Greco-Roman traditions, Gregorius leaves with Nikolas, a fellow wrestler.

Fabian catches up with the two and befriends them, having realised that he can host wrestling in London without interference from Kristo if he can persuade his father to support the enterprise.

Fabian approaches Phil and Helen with his proposal, then asks for an investment. Incredulous, Phil offers to provide half of the required £400, if Fabian can equal it. Desperate, Fabian asks Figler, a panhandler and unofficial head of an informal society of street criminals, Googin, a forger, and Anna, a Thameside smuggler, but none can offer any help.

Fabian is eventually approached by Helen, who offers the £200 in exchange for a licence to continue running her own nightclub, having obtained the money by selling an expensive fur Phil recently bought for her. Fabian agrees, but tricks Helen by having Googin forge the licence.

Meanwhile, Phil is visited by associates of Kristo, who warn him to keep Fabian away from London's wrestling scene. Already suspecting Helen of duplicity, Phil neglects to warn Fabian, who proceeds to open his own gym with Gregorius and Nikolas as the stars, and Phil as a silent partner.

A furious Kristo visits the gym, only to discover that his father is supporting Fabian's endeavour. Meeting with Phil, the two plot to kill Fabian, but realise that they can only do so if Gregorius leaves Fabian. Phil meets with Fabian and removes his backing, suggesting that Fabian get Nikolas and The Strangler, a showy wrestler favoured by Kristo, into the ring together to keep the business going, knowing that Gregorius would never allow it.

Finding The Strangler's manager, Mickey Beer, Fabian convinces him to support the fight, and taunts The Strangler into confronting Gregorius and Nikolas. Gregorius agrees to the fight, convinced by Fabian that it will prove that his traditional style of wrestling is superior. Beer asks Fabian for £200 to cover his fee, so Fabian asks Phil for the money. Instead, Phil calls Kristo, informing him that The Strangler is in Fabian's gym.

Betrayed, Fabian steals the money from Mary, and returns to the gym. However, The Strangler goads Gregorius into a prolonged and brutal fight, during which Nikolas' wrist is broken.

Gregorius eventually defeats The Strangler in the ring as Kristo arrives, but dies minutes later in his son's arms from exhaustion. Seeing that both his business and protection are lost, Fabian flees.

In revenge of his father's death, Kristo puts a £1,000 bounty on Fabian's head, sending word to all of London's underworld. Fabian is hunted through the night, first by Kristo's men, then by Figler, who attempts to trap Fabian for the reward. Convinced that her licence is authentic, Helen leaves Phil, only to discover that the work is a worthless forgery.

She returns to Phil in desperation, only to discover that he has committed suicide, leaving everything to Molly, the club's elderly cleaner and flower stand operator.

Fabian eventually finds shelter at Anna's scow on the Thames, but has already been tracked down by Kristo. Mary arrives, and Fabian attempts to redeem himself by shouting to Kristo that Mary betrayed him, so that she will get the reward. As he runs towards where Kristo is standing on Hammersmith Bridge, he is caught and killed by The Strangler, who throws his body into the river. The Strangler is arrested moments later, and Kristo walks away from the scene.

Cast
 Richard Widmark as Harry Fabian
 Gene Tierney as Mary Bristol (singing voice dubbed by Maudie Edwards)
 Googie Withers as Helen Nosseross
 Hugh Marlowe as Adam Dunne
 Francis L. Sullivan as Phil Nosseross, Silver Fox Club
 Herbert Lom as Kristo
 Aubrey Dexter as Mr Chilk
 Maureen Delany as Anna Siberia/O'Leary
 Stanislaus Zbyszko as Gregorius the Great
 Mike Mazurki as The Strangler
 Ada Reeve as Molly
 Charles Farrell as Mickey Beer
 Ken Richmond as Nikolas of Athens
 Edward Chapman as Hoskins
 James Hayter as Figler
 Gibb McLaughlin as Googin (uncredited) 

 Adelaide Hall (scenes cut from the final edit)

Critical reaction
The film has been described as innovative in its lack of sympathetic characters, the deadly punishment of its protagonist (in the American version), and especially its realistic portrayal of triumph by racketeers who are neither slowed nor at all worried by the machinations of law. Critics of the time did not react well; typical were Bosley Crowther's comments in The New York Times:[Dassin's] evident talent has been spent upon a pointless, trashy yarn, and the best that he has accomplished is a turgid pictorial grotesque...he tried to bluff it with a very poor script—and failed...[the screenplay] is without any real dramatic virtue, reason or valid story-line...little more than a melange of maggoty episodes having to do with the devious endeavors of a cheap London night-club tout to corner the wrestling racket—an ambition in which he fails. And there is only one character in it for whom a decent, respectable person can give a hoot.

The film was first re-evaluated in the 1960s, as film noir became a more esteemed genre, and it has continued to receive laudatory reviews since then. Writing for Slant Magazine, Nick Schager said,Jules Dassin's 1950 masterpiece was his first movie after being exiled from America for alleged communist politics, and the unpleasant ordeal seems to have infused his work with a newfound resentment and pessimism, as the film—about foolhardy scam-artist Harry Fabian (Richard Widmark) and his ill-advised attempts to become a big shot—brims with anger, anxiousness, and a shocking dose of unadulterated hatred.

In The Village Voice, film critic Michael Atkinson wrote, "... the movie's a moody piece of Wellesian chiaroscuro (shot by Max Greene, né Mutz Greenbaum) and an occasionally discomfiting underworld plunge, particularly when the mob-controlled wrestling milieu explodes into a kidney-punching donnybrook."

In Street with No Name: A History of the Classic American Film Noir, film critic Andrew Dickos acclaims it as one of the seminal noirs of the classical period, writing: "in a perfect fusion of mood and character, Dassin created a work of emotional power and existential drama that stands as a paradigm of noir pathos and despair."

Preservation
The Academy Film Archive preserved Night and the City in 2004.

The British Lion Film Production Disc collection at the British Library includes music from the film soundtrack of Night and the City, upon which Adelaide Hall is featured.

Release
Night and the City was released in the United Kingdom in April 1950.

The film was released as a Region 1 DVD in February 2005 as part of The Criterion Collection and in Region 2 by the BFI in October 2007. Both discs contained the U.S. version only. Criterion issued the film on Blu-ray as a two-disc edition containing both the U.S. and U.K. versions in August 2015. In September 2015, the BFI also released the film on Blu-ray, again containing both versions.

Remake 

Night and the City, a 1992 film starring Robert De Niro, was based on the film.

References

Bibliography
 
 Harry Tomicek: Der Wahnsinnsläufer. Night and The City. von Jules Dassin, Kamera: Max Greene (1950). In: Christian Cargnelli, Michael Omasta (eds.): Schatten. Exil. Europäische Emigranten im Film Noir. PVS, Vienna 1997, .

External links

 
 
 
 
Night and the City: In the Labyrinth an essay by Paul Arthur at the Criterion Collection
 Night and the City essay by author Geoff Mayer at Film Noir of the Week.
  (the wrestling scene)

1950 films
1950 crime drama films
20th Century Fox films
British black-and-white films
British crime drama films
Film noir
Films scored by Franz Waxman
Films directed by Jules Dassin
Films set in London
Films shot in London
Professional wrestling films
1950s English-language films
1950s British films